Hamid Mohamed Azim (born 3 June 1956) is an Egyptian volleyball player. He competed in the men's tournament at the 1976 Summer Olympics.

References

1956 births
Living people
Egyptian men's volleyball players
Olympic volleyball players of Egypt
Volleyball players at the 1976 Summer Olympics
Place of birth missing (living people)